Misanthropy Pure is the third studio album by hardcore punk band Shai Hulud, released on May 26, 2008 in Europe (except in Germany, Austria, Switzerland and Italy, where it arrived on May 30) and May 27 in the U.S. through Metal Blade Records, the band's first record release by that label. It has been described as the blender between 1997's Hearts Once Nourished with Hope and Compassion and 2003's That Within Blood Ill-Tempered, by Shai Hulud's guitarist, Matt Fox:

"It's faster, slower, more metal, less metal, more rock, more progressive, and less progressive than anything we've ever done. It's like that movie 'Deep Blue Sea'. The tagline on the DVD box is 'Bigger. Faster. Smarter. Meaner.' That's how this record is. Is it the best thing we've ever done? I don't know. We'll leave that to those who listen." 

A music video was made for the song "Misanthropy Pure", first shown on MTV2's Headbangers Ball on May 22, 2008.

Track listing

Credits
Matt Mazzali - vocals
Matt Fox - guitar, producer
Matthew Fletcher - bass guitar
Andrew Gormley - drums
Greg Thomas - engineer, producer
Dave Quiggle - artwork
Recorded at Silver Bullet Studios in Burlington, CT
Mixed by Eric Rachel at Trax East

Release history

References

2008 albums
Shai Hulud albums
Metal Blade Records albums